Daniel Buck (November 9, 1753 – August 16, 1816) was an American lawyer and politician. He served as a United States representative from Vermont.

Biography
Buck was born in Hebron, Connecticut, the son of Thomas and Jane Buck.

He served as a soldier in the American Revolution and rose to the rank of sergeant as a member of Captain David Wheeler's Company in the Massachusetts militia regiment commanded by Benjamin Simonds.  He was wounded and lost an arm at the Battle of Bennington in 1777, and received a pension from the state of Massachusetts.

He studied law with Sylvester Gilbert and was admitted to the bar in 1783. He practiced law in Thetford, Vermont, and served as state's attorney of Orange County from 1783 to 1785 and Orange County's clerk of the court in 1783 and 1784.

He was assistant secretary of the Vermont House of Representatives in 1784, and secretary pro tempore of Vermont's Governor's Council in 1785.

Buck moved to Norwich, Vermont in 1785.  The town's first attorney, he also supported himself by carrying out the duties of town highway surveyor and pound keeper.  He was a delegate to the 1791 convention which ratified the United States Constitution and made possible Vermont's admission to the Union as the 14th state.  In 1792 he served on the state Council of Censors, which met periodically to review acts of the Vermont House and ensure their constitutionality.

He was a member of the Vermont House of Representatives in 1793 and 1794, and served as Speaker.  He served as Vermont Attorney General from 1793 to 1795.

He was elected as a Federalist to the Fourth Congress, serving from March 4, 1795, to March 3, 1797. He was an unsuccessful candidate for renomination in 1796.

In 1799 Buck received the honorary degree of Master of Arts from Dartmouth College.

Buck was state's attorney for Windsor County in 1802 and 1803.

In 1805 Buck moved to Chelsea, Vermont, where he practiced law and again served as a member of the Vermont House of Representatives in 1806 and 1807.  Among the students who studied law with Buck was William A. Palmer.

While living in Chelsea Buck was imprisoned for debt.  He was given a parole called "freedom of the prison", which enabled him to work and raise money to pay off his creditors.

Death
Buck died in Chelsea on August 16, 1816, and was interred at the Old Chelsea Cemetery in Chelsea.

Family
In 1786 Buck married Content Ashley of Norwich.  They were the parents of eleven children, seven of whom lived to adulthood.

Daniel Buck's son, Daniel Azro Ashley Buck, was also a U.S. Representative from Vermont, and served in the Twentieth Congress (March 4, 1827 to March 3, 1829).

References

External links 

 
 The Political Graveyard
 govtrack.us
 The State of Vermont: Office of the Attorney General

1753 births
1816 deaths
People from Hebron, Connecticut
People from Chelsea, Vermont
Members of the Vermont House of Representatives
Speakers of the Vermont House of Representatives
Vermont lawyers
State's attorneys in Vermont
Vermont Attorneys General
Federalist Party members of the United States House of Representatives from Vermont
People of colonial Connecticut
Continental Army soldiers
People of Connecticut in the American Revolution
American lawyers admitted to the practice of law by reading law
19th-century American lawyers